Lemonia ponticus is a moth in the family Brahmaeidae (older classifications placed it in Lemoniidae). It was described by Per Olof Christopher Aurivillius in 1894.

References

Brahmaeidae
Moths described in 1894